Popoudina dorsalis is a moth of the family Erebidae. It was described by Francis Walker in 1855. It is found in South Africa.

References

 

Endemic moths of South Africa
Spilosomina
Moths described in 1855